

D

References